Wilderville is an unincorporated community in Josephine County, Oregon, United States. Wilderville is located along U.S. Route 199 southwest of Grants Pass. Wilderville has a post office with ZIP code 97543.

References

Unincorporated communities in Josephine County, Oregon
Unincorporated communities in Oregon